Mykhailo Kulynyak (ukr.: Михайло Андрійович Кулиняк, born 4 March 1969) is a Ukrainian statesman and public figure, Minister of Culture and Tourism of Ukraine (2010–2012).

Biography 
1994 – graduated from the Kyiv Conservatory as a violinist.
2003 – graduated from the International University of Science and Technology with a degree in "Organizational Management (Master of Organizational Management)".
2003 – graduated from the National Academy for Public Administration with a degree in Public Administration (Master of Public Administration).

 03.2004 — 03.2005 — Assistant Deputy Minister of the Cabinet of Ministers of Ukraine.
 8 November 2006 — 20 August 2008 — Deputy Minister of Culture and Tourism of Ukraine.
 11 March 2010 — 9 December 2010 — Minister of Culture and Tourism of Ukraine.
 9 December 2010 — 24 December 2012 — Minister of Culture of Ukraine.
 8 February 2013 to 2014 – General Director of National Palace of Arts "Ukraine".
 Since 2016 – Director of the Institute of Contemporary Art of National Academy of Management of Culture and Arts.

References

External links 
Kulinyak: The position of director of the Art Arsenal does not apply to those who fall under lustration

1969 births
Living people
Ukrainian political people
People from Drohobych
Culture and tourism ministers of Ukraine